The checkered elephant shrew or checkered sengi (Rhynchocyon cirnei) is a species of elephant shrew in the family Macroscelididae.

Description 

Their average tail length is slightly over 25 centimeters, which is slightly shorter than their body length. Their coat is usually a light to medium brown, but it can range from beige to dark brown. Their back contains alternating chestnut and lighter colors, creating a "checkered" pattern. Checkered elephant shrews also contain stripes on the sides of their body, which have a darker color than most of their body.

Range and habitat 

It is found in Democratic Republic of the Congo, Malawi, Mozambique, Tanzania, Uganda, Zambia, and possibly Central African Republic. Its natural habitats are subtropical or tropical dry forest, subtropical or tropical moist lowland forest, subtropical or tropical moist montane forest, and subtropical or tropical dry shrubland. It is threatened by habitat loss.

Behavior 

Checkered elephant shrews will mate for life. The pair of them will defend a territory of a few acres.

Diet 

The checkered elephant shrew is primarily an insectivore, eating termites, ants, beetles and centipedes. It also will eat mollusks, eggs and small mammals, amphibians and birds.

References

External links 
Checkered elephant shrew on Animal diversity web

Elephant shrews
Mammals described in 1847
Taxa named by Wilhelm Peters
Taxonomy articles created by Polbot